The Australia women's national cricket team toured India in January and February 1984. They played against India in four Test matches and four One Day Internationals, with the Test series ending as a 0–0 draw and Australia winning the ODI series 4–0.

Squads

WODI Series

1st ODI

2nd ODI

3rd ODI

4th ODI

WTest Series

1st Test

2nd Test

3rd Test

4th Test

References

External links
Australia Women tour of India 1983/84 from Cricinfo

Australia women's national cricket team tours
Women's international cricket tours of India